A multicab is a small light truck in the Philippines that is usually used as public transport.  Just like jeepneys, they have fixed routes.  Although, there are multicabs that serve as taxicabs where passengers go exactly where they want, as a tricycle might.  Aside from being a mode of mass transportation, it can also be customized for other purposes such as a pickup truck or a private van.

Multicabs can be found throughout the Philippines.  It can be found in urban areas such as Metro Manila, Metro Cebu and Metro Davao.  A multicab is lightweight, narrow and small and can navigate through narrow streets. With seating capacity of around 11 to 13, the passenger space also tends to be cramped relative to a van.  There are also multicabs that have a seating capacity less than 11.  Small multicabs typically have three-cylinder engines.  In Tacloban, there are plans to convert the multicab engines into rechargeable batteries for sustainable energy.

A multicab is about as comfortable as a jeepney, and usually has a cleaner and less noisy engine. A group travelling by multicab may hire a multicab for a day (e.g. for family use) and pay the daily fee, while optionally buying food and drink for the driver. A multicab is typically assembled in a factory in the Philippines with surplus parts from Japan and South Korea, in contrast to jeepneys, which are usually hand-made. Popular makes are Suzuki models such as, Suzuki LMM 376 and Suzuki Every 660, or more rugged cousin, the Autozam Scrum (Locally known as "Suzuki" Scrum, due to interchangeability of parts between these two vehicles). Multicab models sometimes also using Daihatsu Hijet and Mitsubishi Minicab.  The key of a certain model of a multicab can open a locked car. 

Generally, a multicab usually refers to any kei truck imported from Japan that has been converted for commercial or public transportation use in the Philippines. Many Kei trucks and vans have found a second life in the Philippines as a form of public transportation. Mainly modifying it with off-road tires or with more added seating capacity to accommodate passengers and such. A fully-stock Kei truck without other mentioned customization (aside from being converted into Left-Hand Drive) can still be called a Multicab. The term "Multi" refers to the interchangeability of factory pre-assembled pieces of equipment and parts that can be customized for the specific needs of the customer, while "Cab" refers to the chassis and cab of the Kei truck. Sometimes, non-Kei alternatives, such as the "FB vans" can still be called Multicabs as long as they have the same basic two long parallel benches found in jeepneys as they are also chassis cabs, therefore, sharing the same kind of configuration. Popular examples include the Mitsubishi L300, Hyundai H100, Isuzu Traviz, and the Suzuki Super Carry. Though many large counterpart variants of these vehicles like the truck-based and pick-up truck-based variants cannot be called Multicabs.

See also
 Jeepney
 Tricycle
 Transportation in the Philippines

References

Public transportation in the Philippines
Road transportation in the Philippines
Transportation in Luzon
Transportation in Mindanao
Transportation in the Visayas